Hongyanping Station is a station on International Expo branch of Line 6 of Chongqing Rail Transit in Chongqing municipality, China, which opened in 2020. It is located in Beibei District.

References

Railway stations in Chongqing
Railway stations in China opened in 2020
Chongqing Rail Transit stations